Buttimer is a surname. Notable people with the surname include:

Anne Buttimer (1938–2017), Irish geographer
Anthony Buttimer, Irish soccer referee
James Buttimer, shot dead in the Dunmanway killings
Jerry Buttimer (born 1967), Irish politician
Jim Buttimer, Irish sportsperson